Ayelech Worku (born June 12, 1979) is an Ethiopian long-distance runner, most known for winning two World Championships bronze medals on the 5000 metres. She was born in the Arsi Zone of the Oromia province, the same region as double Olympic champion Haile Gebrselassie.

Worku began competing at a young age: she won the 5000 m silver medal at the 1995 All-Africa Games when she was sixteen years old and won the event at the 1996 World Junior Championships in Athletics. 
She gained selection for her first Olympics soon after and took part in the 1996 Atlanta Olympics. She finished twelfth in the 5000 m final but she was Ethiopia's best performer in the event. She attended her first World Championships in Athletics shortly after and finished 12th in the 5000 m.

She began to make progress in cross country running, taking the junior bronze at the 1997 IAAF World Cross Country Championships before helping Ethiopia to the team silver at the 1998 edition and then the team gold with a fourth-place finish in the long race at the 1999 IAAF World Cross Country Championships. She finished third in the 1999–2000 IAAF World Cross Challenge. A ninth place at the 2000 World Championships competition brought yet another team gold for Ethiopia.

Individual medals came at track competitions: she recorded a 5000 m personal best to take the bronze medal at the 1999 World Championships in Athletics. Soon after, she scored the gold medal at the 1999 All-Africa Games. Worku made her second Olympic appearance at the 2000 Sydney Games, where she finished in fourth place in the 5000 m behind compatriot Gete Wami. Worku reached the world podium at the next event however by repeating her 5000 m bronze medal feat of two years previous at the 2001 World Championships in Athletics. She finished a close second behind Derartu Tulu in the 10,000 metres at the 2001 Goodwill Games.

Worku began to compete in road running competitions after 2002, winning the 2003 Montferland Run and the 2007 edition of the Hamburg Marathon.

Personal bests
1500 metres - 4:10.08 (1999)
3000 metres - 8:32.80 (2002)
5000 metres - 14:41.23 (2000)
10,000 metres - 31:38.08 (2001)
Marathon - 2:29:14 (2007)

Achievements

References

1979 births
Living people
Ethiopian female marathon runners
Ethiopian female long-distance runners
Olympic athletes of Ethiopia
Athletes (track and field) at the 1996 Summer Olympics
Athletes (track and field) at the 2000 Summer Olympics
World Athletics Championships medalists
World Athletics Championships athletes for Ethiopia
Sportspeople from Oromia Region
African Games gold medalists for Ethiopia
African Games medalists in athletics (track and field)
Goodwill Games medalists in athletics
Athletes (track and field) at the 1995 All-Africa Games
Athletes (track and field) at the 1999 All-Africa Games
Competitors at the 2001 Goodwill Games
20th-century Ethiopian women
21st-century Ethiopian women